Ernest Richard Ward Neale,  (July 3, 1923 – May 20, 2008) was a Canadian geologist. His scientific research contributed to the understanding of the large-scale structure of the northern Appalachian mountains of Atlantic Canada. Neale used his enthusiasm for geology to inform students and the general public about discoveries in his field through television, radio, pamphlets, booklets, news magazines, and the popular press.

Neale worked with the Geological Survey of Canada and Memorial University of Newfoundland. He, along with John Rodgers of Yale University, were the first to recognize the transported oceanic sedimentary rocks that overlie ancient shelf deposits in western Newfoundland.

Early life

Neale was born in Beaconsfield, Québec in July 1923. He served in the Royal Canadian Navy during the Second World War between 1943 and 1945. After the war he went to study at McGill University, Montreal. He completed his BSc in 1949. In 1950, Ward married Roxie and they moved to New Haven, Connecticut so Ward could attend Yale University. There he obtained his MSc. (1951) and PhD (1952).

Career
Neale worked briefly as an assistant professor at the University of Rochester, New York, between 1952 and 1954. After that he went on to work for the Geological Survey of Canada. His first position was as to head the Appalachian Geology Section. Between 1963 and 1965, Neale served as the Commonwealth Geology Liaison Officer. When he returned he was given the responsibility to head the Precambrian Geology Section.

In 1968, Neale left the Survey to become Professor and head of the Geology Department at Memorial University of Newfoundland. In 1972, he organized a Montreal-based symposium for the International Geological Congress on Geoscience Aid to developing Countries. This symposium led to the creation of the Association of Geoscientists for International Development.

In 1976, Neale moved to Calgary as Head of the Geological Information Subdivision of the Institute of Sedimentary and Petroleum Geology. He retained his ties to academia whilst in Calgary by holding an adjunct position at the University of Calgary and acting on the University Senate.

In 1982, Neale returned to Newfoundland to accept the position of Vice-President Academic of Memorial University. He held that position until retiring in 1987. After retirement, Ward and his wife moved to Calgary, Alberta.

Other positions held
1972-1973, President of the Geological Association of Canada
1973-1978, Director of the Canadian Geological Foundation
1974-1980, Editor of the Canadian Journal of Earth Sciences
1976, President of the Canadian Geoscience Council
Chaired the Royal Society of Canada's Committee on Public Awareness of Science
co-Founder of the Calgary Science Network
1989, Chair of the Calgary Science Network

Honours and awards
 was a Fellow of the Geological Society of America for over 50 years
 was a Fellow of the Royal Society of Canada
 1975, awarded the Bancroft Award by the Royal Society of Canada
 1977, awarded an honorary degree from the University of Calgary
 1977, awarded a Queen Elizabeth II Silver Jubilee Medal
 1977, awarded the R. T. Bell Medal by the Canadian Mining Journal
 1981, awarded a Distinguished Service Award by the Geological Association of Canada
 1986, awarded the Ambrose Medal of the Geological Association of Canada
 1990, made an Officer of the Order of Canada
 1992, awarded the 125th Anniversary of the Confederation of Canada Medal by the Government of Canada
 1994, honored by the creation of the E. R. Ward Neale Medal by the Geological Association of Canada
 2003, awarded an honorary award for a significant contribution to the field of education by the International Geoscience Education Organization

References

 Neale's Obituary. Retrieved May 26, 2008.
 Memorial University of Newfoundland Gazette August 25, 1995. Retrieved May 26, 2008.
 Memorial University of Newfoundland Gazette June 19, 1997. Retrieved May 26, 2008.
 Geological Society of America 50+ years. Retrieved May 26, 2008.
  University of Calgary Honorary Degree List. Retrieved May 26, 2008.
 International Geoscience Education Organization. Retrieved May 26, 2008.

External links
 The E.R. Ward Neale Medal

1923 births
2008 deaths
20th-century Canadian geologists
Geological Survey of Canada personnel
Fellows of the Royal Society of Canada
McGill University alumni
Academic staff of the Memorial University of Newfoundland
Officers of the Order of Canada
Yale University alumni
Fellows of the Geological Society of America
Canadian expatriates in the United States